Liz Williams (born 1965) is a British science fiction writer, historian and occultist.  The Ghost Sister, her first novel, was published in 2001. Both this novel and her next, Empire of Bones (2002) were nominated for the Philip K. Dick Award.  She is also the author of the Inspector Chen series, and of the historical survey of magic in the British Isles and beyond Miracles of Our Own Making: A History of Paganism (2020).

Williams is the daughter of a stage magician and a Gothic novelist. She holds a PhD in Philosophy of Science from Cambridge (for which her supervisor was Peter Lipton). She has had short stories published in Asimov's, Interzone, The Third Alternative and Visionary Tongue. From the mid-nineties until 2000, she lived and worked in Kazakhstan. Her experiences there are reflected in her 2003 novel Nine Layers of Sky.  This novel brings into the modern era the Bogatyr Ilya Muromets and Manas the hero of the Epic of Manas. Her novels have been published in the US and the UK, while her third novel The Poison Master (2003) has been translated into Dutch.

Bibliography

Novels
The Ghost Sister (June 2001) - Philip K. Dick Award nominee
Empire of Bones (March 2002) - Philip K. Dick Award nominee
The Poison Master (January 2003)
Nine Layers of Sky (August 2003)
Worldsoul (June 2012)

Banner of Souls
Banner of Souls (September 2004) - Shortlisted for the 20th Arthur C. Clarke Award, Philip K. Dick Award nominee
Winterstrike (September 2008)
Phosphorus (February 2018)

Comet Weather
Comet Weather (2020)
Blackthorn Winter (January 2021)

Darkland
Darkland (February 2006)
Bloodmind (February 2007)

Detective Inspector Chen
Snake Agent (September 2005) - Published in French as La traite des âmes (2014)
The Demon and the City (August 2006)
Precious Dragon (June 2007)
The Shadow Pavilion (August 2009)
The Iron Khan (December 2010)
Morningstar (January 2015, self-published)

Short stories
"Tycho and the Stargazer" (December 2003) in Asimov's Science Fiction Vol 27, No 12
"Out of Scarlight" (2013) in Old Mars (anthology)

Collections 
The Banquet of the Lords of Night and Other Stories (2004)
A Glass of Shadow (2011)
Vodyanoy/Loosestrife (2015)
The Light Warden (2015)

Nonfiction
Miracles of Our Own Making (2020)
Modern Handfasting (2021)

Diary of a Witchcraft Shop  (with Trevor Jones)
Diary of a Witchcraft Shop (2011)
Diary of a Witchcraft Shop 2 (2013)

References

External links
Liz Williams's LiveJournal

Night Shade Books publisher of the Detective Inspector Chen series and The Banquet of the Lords of Night and Other Stories
2006 interview at SFF Chronicles (UK)

English science fiction writers
Living people
1965 births
Place of birth missing (living people)
British science fiction writers
British speculative fiction writers
Women science fiction and fantasy writers
British women novelists
Weird fiction writers
People from Gloucester